= Pico de Teyra =

Mountain in Mexico

- Location within Mexico

Highest point
- Elevation: 2,790 m (9,154 ft)
- Coordinates: 19°1′N 98°37′W

Geography
- Location: Zacatecas
- Parent range: Sierra Madre Occidental

Pico de Teyra is a mountain 2,790 m (9,154 ft) above sea level, located in the state of Zacatecas (highest of this state) in Mexico.
